Victor Muffat-Jeandet (born 5 March 1989) is a French World Cup alpine ski racer.

Career
Born in Aix-les-Bains, Savoie, Muffat-Jeandet made his World Cup debut in February 2009 in Kranjska Gora, Slovenia. He achieved his first podium in 2015, a runner-up finish in a super combined at Wengen, Switzerland; his first win came three years later at the same race.

At the World Championships, Muffat-Jeandet finished 26th in the slalom in 2013 and 7th in the giant slalom in 2015.

On his Olympic Games debut in PyeongChang, he earned his first medal, a bronze, in the combined and followed that result with two 6th places in the giant slalom and slalom.

World Cup results

Season standings

Race podiums
1 win – (1 AC)
11 podiums – (5 GS, 1 SL, 5 AC); 50 top tens

World Championships results

Olympic results

References

External links

French Ski Team – 2023 men's A team – 

1989 births
Living people
French male alpine skiers
People from Aix-les-Bains
Université Savoie-Mont Blanc alumni
Alpine skiers at the 2018 Winter Olympics
Olympic alpine skiers of France
Olympic bronze medalists for France
Medalists at the 2018 Winter Olympics
Olympic medalists in alpine skiing
Sportspeople from Savoie